Marchirolo is a comune (municipality) in the Province of Varese in the Italian region Lombardy, located about  northwest of Milan and about  north of Varese.

Marchirolo borders the following municipalities: Cadegliano-Viconago, Cuasso al Monte, Cugliate-Fabiasco, Marzio.

Demographic evolution

References

Cities and towns in Lombardy